A tornado warning (SAME code: TOR) is a severe weather warning product of the National Weather Service that is issued by regional offices of weather forecasting agencies throughout the world to alert the public when a tornado has been reported or indicated by weather radar within the parent severe thunderstorm. It can be issued after a tornado, funnel cloud and rotation in the clouds has been witnessed by the public, storm chasers, emergency management or law enforcement, and indicates that residents in the affected areas should take immediate safety precautions.

A warning should not be confused with a tornado watch, issued in the United States by the Storm Prediction Center (SPC) and in other countries by applicable regional forecasting agencies or national severe weather guidance centers, which only indicates that conditions are favorable for the formation of tornadoes. Although a tornado warning is generally a higher alert level than a tornado watch, in the U.S., it can be surpassed by a higher-level alert—structured as wording that can be added to the official warning product—to warn the public of intense tornadoes affecting a densely populated area.

A tornado watch is not required for a warning to be issued; tornado warnings are occasionally issued when a tornado watch is not active (i.e. when a severe thunderstorm watch is active, or when no watches are in effect), if a severe thunderstorm develops and has a confirmed tornado or strong rotation.

Early history

The first official tornado forecast—and tornado warning—was made by United States Air Force Capt. (later Col.) Robert C. Miller and Major Ernest Fawbush, on March 25, 1948. The first such forecast came after the events that occurred five days earlier on March 20, 1948; Miller – a California native who became stationed at Tinker Air Force Base three weeks earlier – was assigned to work the late shift as a forecaster for the base's Air Weather Service office that evening, analyzing U.S. Weather Bureau surface maps and upper-air charts that failed to note atmospheric instability and moisture content present over Oklahoma that would be suitable for producing thunderstorm activity, erroneously forecasting dry conditions for that night. Base personnel received an alert written by the staff sergeant on duty with Miller, minutes before the twister struck Tinker several minutes later around 10:00 p.m., damaging several military aircraft (with total damage estimated at $10 million) that could not be secured in time before it crossed the base grounds.

Following an inquiry the next day before a tribunal of five generals who traveled to Tinker from Washington, D.C., who ruled that the March 20 tornado was an "act of God ... not forecastable given the present state of the art", base commander Gen. Fred Borum tasked Miller and Fawbush to follow up on the board's suggestion to consider methods of forecasting tornadic thunderstorms. Over the next three days, Miller and Fawbush studied reports and charts from previous tornado events to determine the atmospheric conditions favorable for the development of tornadic activity, in an effort to predict such events with some degree of accuracy. At the time, there had not been studies on how tornadoes formed; however, military radars were being adapted for forecasting use, allowing forecasters to see the outlines of storms but not their internal attributes such as rotation. Miller and Fawbush's findings on atmospheric phenomenon present in past outbreaks would aid in their initial forecast, as the day's surface and upper-air analysis charts determined the same conditions present on March 20 were present on the 25th, concluded that central Oklahoma would have the highest risk for tornadoes during the late-afternoon and evening.

Borum, who had put together a severe weather safety plan for base personnel, then suggested that Miller and Fawbush issue a severe thunderstorm forecast, and then asked the men if they would issue a tornado forecast based on the similarities between the conditions that produced the tornado which hit the base five days earlier, which they were reluctant to do. Fawbush wrote the forecast message that Miller would type and issued it to base operations at 2:50 p.m. as thunderstorms were approaching from North Texas. Defying the high odds against two tornadoes hitting the same area in five days, one hit the Tinker campus around 6:00 p.m., to the surprise of Miller (who left the base an hour earlier, believing their forecast would not pan out), who found out about the storm (produced by two thunderstorms that merged to the southwest of Tinker) via a radio report. Miller and Fawbush would not put out another tornado forecast until March 25, 1949, when they successfully predicted tornadic activity would occur in southeastern Oklahoma.

Miller and Fawbush soon would distribute their tornado forecasts to the American Red Cross and Oklahoma Highway Patrol, after giving William Maughan, chief meteorologist at the U.S. Weather Bureau's Oklahoma City office (who provided them with additional archived weather data to help fine-tune their forecasts), permission to relay their forecasts to those agencies. The relative accuracy of the forecasts restarted a debate over their reliability and whether military or civilian agencies should have jurisdiction over the issuance of weather warnings. The USAF had pioneered tornado forecasting and tornado warnings, although John P. Finley had developed the first experimental tornado forecasts in 1885. Two years later, he and other officials with the agency were prohibited by the United States Signal Service's weather service from using the word "tornado" in forecasts. They were instead directed to refer to "severe local storms". This position on tornado forecasting would be shared by the U.S. Weather Bureau after its formation in 1890, fearing that tornado forecasts were insufficiently reliable and that such warnings would incite panic among the public. The side effect of this policy was that the lack of warning resulted in a steady increase in the number of tornado-related fatalities through the 1950s, with some events prior to 1948 (such as the deadliest tornado in U.S. history, the Tri-State Tornado in March 1925, and the Glazier–Higgins–Woodward tornadoes in April 1947) having death tolls well over 100.

In 1938, the Weather Bureau rescinded its ban on the usage of the word "tornado" in weather products disseminated to emergency management personnel. The Bureau would develop a network of volunteer storm spotters in the early 1940s during World War II, to provide warning of tornadoes to workers in munitions plants and strategic factories. The ban on issuing tornado warnings to the general public would not be revoked until Chief of Bureau Francis W. Reichelderfer officially lifted the ban in a Circular Letter issued on July 12, 1950, to all first order stations: "Weather Bureau employees should avoid statements that can be interpreted as a negation of the Bureau's willingness or ability to make tornado forecasts", and that a "good probability of verification" exist when issuing such forecasts due to the difficulty in accurately predicting tornadic activity. The American Meteorological Society agreed to have Miller and Fawbush present their methodology for forecasting tornadoes during the organization's 1950 meeting in St. Louis; after garnering press coverage for their successful prediction of past tornadoes, AMS representatives decided to open the presentation to the public.

The Air Force began issuing severe weather forecasts relayed to Weather Bureau offices and emergency personnel in tornado-prone regions through the formation of the Severe Weather Warning Center in 1951, before the Bureau's contention that the USAF intruded on its responsibility to relay such forecasts led to the SWWC limiting the release of its tornado forecasts to military personnel; however, the move to prohibit the USAF from widespread releasing of tornado forecasts led to disapproval and heavy criticism from Oklahoma media outlets, given the agency's continued refusal to provide public tornado warnings. The Weather Bureau issued its first experimental public tornado forecast in March 1952, which proved inaccurate and was released too late to become widely available for public consumption; however, a forecast issued the following evening managed to predict an outbreak of tornadoes across most of the warned seven-state area (from Texas to Indiana).

Even after the U.S. Weather Bureau lifted their ban on tornado warnings, the Federal Communications Commission continued to ban television and radio outlets from broadcasting tornado warnings on-air for the same reasoning cited in the Bureau's abolished ban. Broadcast media followed this ban until 1954, when meteorologist Harry Volkman broadcast the first televised tornado warning over WKY-TV (now KFOR-TV) in Oklahoma City, due to his belief that the banning of tornado warnings over broadcast media cost lives. Through an alert issued by the USAF Severe Weather Warning Center, Volkman opted to interrupt regular programming to warn viewers of a reported tornado approaching the Oklahoma City area; although station management and U.S. Weather Bureau officials were displeased with his move, WKY-TV received numerous telephone calls and letters thanking Volkman for the warning.

Definition

A tornado warning is issued when any of the following conditions has occurred:
 a tornado is reported on the ground, or
 a funnel cloud has been reported, or
 strong low-level rotation is indicated by weather radar, or
 a waterspout is headed for landfall.

A tornado warning means there is immediate danger for the warned area and immediate surrounding locations from the severe thunderstorm producing (or likely to produce) a tornado, if not from the relatively narrow tornado itself. Persons in the path of a warned storm are urged to immediately seek shelter in a basement, cellar, safe room or a sturdy above-ground room in the center section of a home or building (such as a bathroom or closet). In addition to the likelihood of a tornado, generally (but not always), a tornado warning also indicates that the parent severe thunderstorm has the likelihood of producing straight-line winds and/or large hail exceeding regional severe criterion as well as intense lightning, heavy rainfall and/or, through associated rain accumulations, flash flooding. A tornado warning therefore implies that it is also a severe thunderstorm warning. Conversely, a severe thunderstorm warning, either in its entirety or sectionally, can be replaced by a tornado warning if a storm exhibits credible characteristics of tornadogenesis from radar and ground observations.

Tornado warnings are issued by weather forecasting agencies based on mesocyclone and debris signatures identifiable on Doppler weather radar, and/or ground truth from storm spotters of signs of tornadogenesis (including wall clouds, funnel clouds and low-level mesocyclonic rotation) and of observed tornadoes. Skywarn, a U.S.-based international spotter program that provides training to citizens on how to spot severe weather phenomena, is offered by forecasting agencies in several countries including the National Weather Service (NWS) in the United States. Used in tandem with Doppler radar information, eyewitness reports can be very helpful for warning the public of an impending tornado, especially when used for ground truthing. Other spotter groups such as the Amateur Radio Emergency Service, news media, local law enforcement agencies, emergency management organizations, cooperative observers; members of the general public also relay information to forecasting agencies for ground truthing.

When a warning is issued, people in the storm's path are advised to use local broadcast media, weather radio, weather app alert notifications and/or SMS notifications to receive warnings and updated storm information. In some tornado-prone regions, tornado sirens, if present, are usually activated within the specified warning region or an entire municipality—varying in coverage based on if a local siren network maintains a sector-organized relay structure—to inform people that a tornado has been sighted or may be forming nearby. Because sirens are generally difficult to hear indoors, residents are advised against completely depending on them as a method of receiving warnings. Local police or fire departments may dispatch crews not assigned to an existing emergency call to travel within a designated area to warn residents to take tornado safety precautions if sirens are disabled due to technical problems or are not present, while automated phone calls may be made to residents for the same purpose in some areas should such disruptions occur.

Advances in technology, both in identifying conditions and in distributing warnings effectively, have been credited with reducing the death toll from tornadoes. The average warning times have increased substantially from -10 to -15 minutes in 1974 to about 15 minutes  (in some cases, the lead time can extend to more than an hour's warning of impending tornadoes). In the United States, the tornado death rate has declined from 1.8 deaths per million people per year in 1925 to only 0.11 per million in 2000. Much of this change is credited to improvements in the tornado warning system, via the various advances in the detection of severe local storms, along with an increase in reports visually confirming severe weather activity via storm spotters, public officials and citizens.

Regional basis

United States
In the United States, tornado warnings are issued by local Weather Forecast Offices of the National Weather Service, which, in conjunction with the Storm Prediction Center, maintains a multi-tier public warning system to disseminate probabilistic outlooks and alerts for tornadoes:
Convective Outlook (categorical and probabilistic forecasts issued at least twice per day to describe threats of general or severe convective storms; severe thunderstorm outlooks for the Day 1 and Day 2 periods include charts and maps assessing tornado probabilities) 
Public Severe Weather Outlook (issued when a significant or widespread severe thunderstorm/tornado outbreak is expected or, particularly from November to March, when strong tornadoes are forecast to occur after nightfall)
Tornado Watch
PDS Tornado Watch (upgraded wording indicating the likelihood of a significant tornado outbreak and/or a credible threat of strong to violent tornadoes within the watch area)
Tornado Warning
PDS Tornado Warning 
Tornado Emergency

Local NWS forecast offices utilize WarnGen software integrated into the Advance Weather Interactive Processing System (AWIPS) to generate the warning statement, which is disseminated through various communication routes accessed by the media and various agencies, on the internet, to NOAA satellites, and over NOAA Weather Radio; additionally, the National Weather Service has the option of requesting activation of the Emergency Alert System (EAS) to interrupt television and radio broadcasts to get the bulletin out quickly. Warnings for tornadoes and severe thunderstorms are outlined in polygonal shapes for map-based weather hazard products distributed to the main agency, individual forecast office websites and the Storm Prediction Center (including open-source APIs available for free use to public weather websites and mobile apps), based on the storm's projected path as determined by Doppler radar at the time of the warning's issuance. In NWS text products, warnings are usually illustrated by individual counties, parishes or other county-equivalent jurisdictions (sections or the entirety thereof, and in list format if it covers more than one jurisdiction), particularly dependent on the jurisdiction's total land area. Prior to October 2007, warnings were issued by the National Weather Service on a per-county basis. SPC and NWS products as well as severe weather alert displays used by some television stations, and desktop and mobile radar software typically highlight tornado warnings with a red or purple polygon or filled county/parish/equivalent jurisdiction outline. (Since the late 2010s, Baron Services broadcast radar software and some public commercial radar software, such as GRLevelX, have used custom polygon coloring to denote tornado warnings based on impact level: usually, purple to indicate warnings for a confirmed tornado and inlined black-on-purple to indicate tornado emergencies.)

The NWS has the option of adding intensified wording to tornado warning products and update statements issued as a Severe Weather Statement (SVS)—"particularly dangerous situation" (PDS) or "tornado emergency"—when a severe threat to human life and considerable or catastrophic property damage from a visually observed or radar-detected large tornado is imminent or ongoing. Tornado emergencies and PDS tornado warnings—which, when warranted, are usually issued when a large tornado is expected to impact a populated area—typically include action statements indicating that the tornado is extremely dangerous and life-threatening, and capable of significant if not total property destruction and severe injury or death from the intense winds and projectile debris; tornado warnings that have the "tornado emergency" wording typically incorporate a combination of the emergency and PDS phrasing above the text's basis (or "hazard") statement.

In March 2012, as part of its implementation of a multi-tier Impact Based Warning (IBW) system to notify the public and emergency management officials of the severity of specific severe weather phenomena, the NWS Weather Forecast Offices in Wichita and Topeka, Kansas, and Springfield, St. Louis and Kansas City/Pleasant Hill, Missouri, began incorporating categorical tornado and damage threat indicators for visually confirmed and radar-indicated tornadoes that appear at the bottom of the text products for tornado warnings and associated Severe Weather Statements providing updated storm information. The categorical criteria—which are applicable to all NWS Weather Forecast Offices, primarily those operating within the agency's Central and Southern Region divisions—were introduced to further communicate to the public and prevent complacency of the threat of tornadoes. The NWS expanded the threat and damage indicators to 33 additional Central Region WFOs in March 2013; eight additional offices operating within the Eastern, Southern and Western Region divisions began using the IBW indicators in March 2014. The entire agency began using the format in 2016; IBW formatting was fully implemented for other individual warning bulletins in July 2021, when all NWS offices incorporated damage threat indicators into severe thunderstorm warnings. The threat indicators consist of four coded taglines, ascending by observational level and damage threat:
 Radar Indicated – Doppler radar indicates the thunderstorm is exhibiting mesocyclonic circulation supportive of tornado formation; generally requires no visual confirmation of a tornado at the time the initial warning or a subsequent severe weather statement is issued. Hazard statements will classify the tornadic rotation as "radar indicated" or "radar-indicated rotation" in the bulletin text when identifying the source of the hazard.
 Observed – Tornado is visually confirmed by storm spotters, law enforcement or other emergency personnel, or detected on radar in concert with an observed intense velocity couplet and/or debris signature. Hazard statements within the bulletin text will indicate a "damaging tornado."
 Considerable (originally "Significant" during the 2012 Kansas and Missouri tests) – Typically reserved for PDS tornado warnings, it indicates credible evidence exists (through visual or radar confirmation) that a tornado capable of producing considerable damage is imminent or ongoing. As with warnings containing the "observed" tag, bulletins with this indicator will classify a "damaging tornado" in the hazard statement.
 Catastrophic – Generally reserved for warnings containing Tornado Emergency wording, it indicates reliable sources have confirmed a violent tornado posing a severe threat to human life and catastrophic property damage is occurring. In most instances, bulletins with this indicator will classify a "deadly tornado" in the hazard statement.

Canada
In Canada, Environment and Climate Change Canada issues tornado warnings through regional Meteorological Service offices based in Vancouver, Edmonton, Winnipeg, Toronto, Montreal and Dartmouth for specified municipalities and census subdivisions. Although issuance criteria are similar to the U.S. National Weather Service, Meteorological Service-issued tornado warnings can include areas not in the immediate approximate path of the tornadic thunderstorm but are in an environment conducive to tornado development from adjacent thunderstorms during the warning timeframe (similar to but covering a smaller total area than tornado watches issued by the U.S. Storm Prediction Center).

Warnings are disseminated to the public through broadcast and online media outlets, and Weatheradio Canada; depending on storm severity and regional office discretion, the warning may require activation of depending on storm severity and regional office discretion, the warning may require activation of the National Public Alerting System (Alert Ready) and feeding provincial alerting systems (such as Alberta Emergency Alert and SaskAlert) to distribute the alert to local broadcast media and cellular phones. Separately, Emergency Management Ontario—upon implementing the system in 2008—issues red alerts for sections of the province under an Environment Canada-issued tornado warning, and can sometimes override the tornado warning if local government or media outlets participate in the program.

Australia
In Australia, tornado warnings are issued by regional offices of the Bureau of Meteorology (BOM) based in Melbourne Docklands, Adelaide, Darwin, Perth and Brisbane. BOM-issued tornado warnings are outlined as either a broad-based warning, covering expected impacts within a weather reporting area, or as a detailed warning, when a thunderstorm is within weather-watch radar range and includes a map depicting any existing thunderstorms and the forecast direction of movement for up to 60 minutes. Warnings are disseminated to the public through terrestrial and online media outlets, and through activation of Emergency Alert Australia to distribute the alert to local broadcast media (led by the Standard Emergency Warning Signal tone), SMS messaging and automated landline phone calls.

Tornado Alert sirens and Fire Tornado Alert sirens part of the Emergency Alert Australia plan, HHEM His Highness Emergency Management plan, Emergency Management Australia plan, HH government plan and the Australian Government plan.

Related warning products

Tornado alert
For many years until the early 1980s, an intermediate type of tornado advisory known as a tornado alert was defined by the National Weather Service and issued by the agency's local forecast offices, indicating that tornado formation was imminent. In theory, tornado alerts covered situations such as visible rotation in clouds and certain other phenomena which are portents of funnel cloud formation. The National Weather Service's use of this advisory began to decline after 1974, although it was still listed on public information materials issued by various media outlets, local NWS offices and other entities for another decade or so.

The criteria which called for tornado alerts in the past now generally result in a tornado warning with clarifying verbiage specifying that the warning was issued because rotation was detected in one way or another, that a wall cloud has formed or a tornado has been spotted or detected. The preferred response to both the tornado alerts and warnings is to take shelter immediately, so distinguishing them could be seen as splitting hairs, especially since storm prediction methods have improved.

The tornado alert was finally eliminated outright because it was made largely obsolete by the advent of Doppler weather radar, which can detect rotational funnel cloud formations earlier than is typically possible by trained spotters and members of the public. With fewer false-positives, radar also helped reduce public confusion over storm types, strengths and precise locations. The last tornado alert to be officially issued was discussed in earnest following the 1974 Super Outbreak.

Fire tornado warning
On August 15, 2020, for the first time in history, the National Weather Service issued a tornado warning for pyrocumulonimbus capable of causing a fire tornado for southeastern Lassen County, California, which was being affected by the Loyalton Fire.

Tornado emergency

The National Weather Service has the option of issuing a tornado emergency, a severe weather statement with unofficial, enhanced wording that is disseminated when a large, extremely violent tornado is about to impact a densely populated area. This category of weather statement is the highest and most urgent level relating to tornadoes, albeit an unofficial alert product. The first tornado emergency was declared on May 3, 1999, when an F5 tornado struck southern portions of the Oklahoma City metropolitan area, causing major damage exceeding $1 billion. In some cases, such as an F3 tornado that struck the Indianapolis, Indiana metropolitan area on September 20, 2002, a tornado emergency has been declared within the initial issuance of the tornado warning. Not all confirmed tornadoes will be considered a "tornado emergency", and such statements are commonly declared when it is believed that the tornado is at a severity in which it would cause a significant threat to life and property.

Examples

Below is an example of a Tornado Warning issued by the National Weather Service office in Topeka, Kansas, for an actual tornado that was confirmed on the ground. The audio files on the right are for Greensburg, Kansas, and upstate South Carolina.
Tornado Warning
KSC111-127-197-160300-
/O.NEW.KTOP.TO.W.0043.190816T0233Z-190816T0300Z/

BULLETIN - EAS ACTIVATION REQUESTED
Tornado Warning 
National Weather Service Topeka KS
933 PM CDT Thu Aug 15 2019

The National Weather Service in Topeka has issued a

* Tornado Warning for...
  Northeastern Morris County in east central Kansas...
  Southwestern Wabaunsee County in east central Kansas...
  Northwestern Lyon County in east central Kansas...

* Until 10:00 PM CDT.
* At 932 PM CDT, a confirmed tornado was located 7 miles east of Alta
  Vista, moving southeast at 20 mph.

  HAZARD...Damaging tornado and golf ball size hail.

  SOURCE...Weather spotters confirmed tornado.

  IMPACT...Flying debris will be dangerous to those caught without
           shelter. Mobile homes will be damaged or destroyed.
           Damage to roofs, windows, and vehicles will occur.  Tree
           damage is likely.

* This tornadic thunderstorm will remain over mainly rural areas of
  northeastern Morris, southwestern Wabaunsee and northwestern Lyon
  Counties.

PRECAUTIONARY/PREPAREDNESS ACTIONS...

To repeat, a tornado is on the ground. TAKE COVER NOW! Move to a
basement or an interior room on the lowest floor of a sturdy
building. Avoid windows. If you are outdoors, in a mobile home, or in
a vehicle, move to the closest substantial shelter and protect
yourself from flying debris.

&&

LAT...LON 3886 9647 3898 9636 3887 9618 3881 9624
      3869 9613 3863 9633
TIME...MOT...LOC 0232Z 309DEG 18KT 3882 9635

TORNADO...OBSERVED
HAIL...1.75IN

$$

Gargan

Below is an example of tornado warning for a pyrocumulonimbus capable of causing a fire tornado. This was the first time a tornado warning was issued for an event of this type.

000
WFUS55 KREV 152135
TORREV
CAC035-152230-
/O.NEW.KREV.TO.W.0001.200815T2135Z-200815T2230Z/

BULLETIN - EAS ACTIVATION REQUESTED
Tornado Warning
National Weather Service Reno NV
235 PM PDT Sat Aug 15 2020

The National Weather Service in Reno has issued a

* Tornado Warning for...
  Southeastern Lassen County in northern California...

* Until 330 PM PDT.
* At 228 PM PDT, a pyrocumulonimbus from the Loyalton Wildfire is
  capable of producing a fire induced tornado and outflow winds in
  excess of 60 mph was located south of Chilcoot, and is nearly
  stationary.

  HAZARD...Tornado.

  SOURCE...Radar indicated rotation.

  IMPACT...Extreme fire behavior with strong outflow winds capable
           of downing trees and starting new fires. This is and
           extremely dangerous situation for fire fighters.

* This tornadic pyrocumulonimbus will remain over mainly rural areas
  of southeastern Lassen County in the vicinity of the fire.

PRECAUTIONARY/PREPAREDNESS ACTIONS...

TAKE COVER NOW! Move to a basement or an interior room on the lowest
floor of a sturdy building. Avoid windows. If you are outdoors, in a
mobile home, or in a vehicle, move to the closest substantial shelter
and protect yourself from flying debris.

&&

LAT...LON 3975 12012 3972 12007 3970 12014 3971 12015
      3973 12015
TIME...MOT...LOC 2128Z 240DEG 0KT 3972 12013

TORNADO...RADAR INDICATED
HAIL...<.75IN

$$

WH

Below is an example of an Environment Canada-issued tornado warning for southeastern Saskatchewan. As with all emergency warnings in Canada, a French-language version would immediately follow.

344
WFCN13 CWWG 262334
TORNADO WARNING
UPDATED BY ENVIRONMENT CANADA
AT 5:34 PM CST TUESDAY 26 JUNE 2012.
----
TORNADO WARNING FOR:
      R.M. OF WHEATLANDS INCLUDING MORTLACH AND PARKBEG
      R.M. OF CARON INCLUDING CARONPORT AND CARON
      R.M. OF MOOSE JAW INCLUDING PASQUA AND BUSHELL PARK
      CITY OF MOOSE JAW.

TORNADO WARNING ENDED FOR:
      R.M. OF RODGERS INCLUDING CODERRE AND COURVAL
      R.M. OF HILLSBOROUGH INCLUDING CRESTWYND AND OLD WIVES LAKE.

----
==DISCUSSION==
AT 5:30 PM CST, PUBLIC REPORTS A  TORNADO CURRENTLY ON THE
GROUND WEST OF MOOSE JAW. RADAR INDICATES THE SEVERE THUNDERSTORM
ASSOCIATED WITH THIS TORNADO IS CURRENTLY JUST SOUTH OF MORTLACH AND
IS SLOWLY TRACKING NORTHEASTWARDS TOWARDS THE CITY OF MOOSE JAW.

See also

 Severe weather terminology (United States)
 Emergency Broadcast System
 Emergency Alert System
 Microburst
 Emergency Communication System

References

Tornado
Weather warnings and advisories